Geertruida Johanna "Truida" Heil-Bonnet (11 July 1920 – 4 July 2014) was a Dutch artistic gymnast who competed in the 1948 Summer Olympics. She was born in Amsterdam.

References

1920 births
2014 deaths
Dutch female artistic gymnasts
Olympic gymnasts of the Netherlands
Gymnasts at the 1948 Summer Olympics
Gymnasts from Amsterdam